Micromonospora taraxaci is a bacterium from the genus Micromonospora which has been isolated from the roots of the plant Taraxacum mongolicum in Harbin, China.

References

 

Micromonosporaceae
Bacteria described in 2015